Attila Menyhárt (born 26 November 1984) is a Hungarian former football player.

References 
Player Profile at Kecskemeti TE Official Website
HLSZ

1984 births
Living people
Footballers from Budapest
Hungarian footballers
Vecsés FC footballers
Kecskeméti TE players
Rákospalotai EAC footballers
Ferencvárosi TC footballers
BFC Siófok players
Vasas SC players
Budaörsi SC footballers
Association football midfielders
Nemzeti Bajnokság I players
Nemzeti Bajnokság II players